The Sick Stockrider is a poem by Australian poet Adam Lindsay Gordon. It was first published in Colonial Monthly magazine in January 1870, although the magazine was dated December 1869. It was later in the poet's second and last poetry collection Bush Ballads and Galloping Rhymes (1870).

Analysis

"The Evening Journal" (Adelaide) called the poem "...the best piece Mr. Gordon ever wrote..." after its publication in Bush Ballads and Galloping Rhymes.

The Oxford History of Australian Literature stated that "The ballad of the dying stockman, with its creed of mateship, its laconic acceptance in true bush style of whatever life and death may offer, led Marcus Clarke to assert that in Gordon's work lay the beginnings of a national school of Australian poetry."

Further publications

 An Anthology of Australian Verse edited by Bertram Stevens (1907)
 The Sick Stockrider and Other Poems by Adam Lindsay Gordon (1945)
 Cross Country : A Book of Australian Verse edited by John Barnes and Brian McFarlane (1984)
 My Country : Australian Poetry and Short Stories Edited by Leonie Kramer (1985)
 Australian Poetry Since 1788 edited by Geoffrey Lehmann and Robert Gray (2011)

See also
 1870 in poetry
 1870 in literature
 1870 in Australian literature

References 

Australian poems
1870 poems
Poems adapted into films